Brit Pettersen Tofte (born 24 November 1961) is a Norwegian former cross-country skier who competed during the 1980s.

Pettersen earned one gold and two bronzes at two Winter Olympic Games. At the FIS Nordic World Ski Championships, she won one gold (4 × 5 km relay - 1982), one silver (20 km - 1985), and two bronzes (5 km - 1982, 10 km - 1987). She also won the 20 km competition at the Holmenkollen ski festival twice (1983 and 1987). In the FIS Cross-Country World Cup, she finished second twice (1981–82, 1982–83) and third twice (1984–85, 1985–86).

She won the Holmenkollen medal in 1986.

In 1986 she won the silver medal at the Norwegian championships in 10 km cross-country running, representing Lillehammer IF.

Cross-country skiing results
All results are sourced from the International Ski Federation (FIS).

Olympic Games
 3 medals – (1 gold, 2 bronze)

World Championships
 4 medals – (1 gold, 1 silver, 2 bronze)

World Cup

Season standings

Individual podiums
10 victories  
23 podiums

Team podiums

 5 victories  
 6 podiums 

Note:  Until the 1999 World Championships and the 1994 Olympics, World Championship and Olympic races were included in the World Cup scoring system.

References

External links

 - click Holmenkollmedaljen for downloadable pdf file 
 - click Vinnere for downloadable pdf file 

1961 births
Living people
Norwegian female cross-country skiers
Norwegian female long-distance runners
Cross-country skiers at the 1980 Winter Olympics
Cross-country skiers at the 1984 Winter Olympics
Cross-country skiers at the 1988 Winter Olympics
Holmenkollen medalists
Holmenkollen Ski Festival winners
Olympic cross-country skiers of Norway
Olympic gold medalists for Norway
Olympic bronze medalists for Norway
Olympic medalists in cross-country skiing
FIS Nordic World Ski Championships medalists in cross-country skiing
Medalists at the 1984 Winter Olympics
Medalists at the 1980 Winter Olympics
Sportspeople from Lillehammer